Xenjapyx is a genus of diplurans in the family Japygidae.

Species
 Xenjapyx bouvieri (Silvestri, 1907)
 Xenjapyx tolaianus Pagés, 1957

References

Diplura